María del Pilar Sánchez Luque (born 28 September 1978 in Coria del Río, Seville), better known by her stage name Pastora Soler, is a Spanish singer. She is also a songwriter and her compositions usually mix copla or flamenco with pop or electronic music.

Soler represented Spain in the Eurovision Song Contest 2012 in Baku, Azerbaijan with the song "Quédate conmigo" and came in 10th place.

Career

Early years 

A precocious chanteuse, she started singing coplas and flamenco songs at several events when she was a child. In 1994 she was signed to the record company Polygram to release her first studio album, Nuestras coplas, which consisted of covers of ten classical copla songs by León or Quiroga. Pop and commercial sounds arrived in 1996 with her second album, El mundo que soné, which was the last she published with Polygram.

1999–2004: Fuente de luna, Corazón congelado and Deseo 

In 1999, she was signed to Emi-Odeón and released her third album, Fuente de luna. This album included her first big hit single, "Dámelo ya", which sold 120,000 copies in Spain and was also a number one hit in Turkey.

In 2001, her fourth album Corazón congelado was published, produced by Carlos Jean. The same-titled single was selected to be the official theme of the 2001 Vuelta a España. The album received a platinum certification for its sales. Her fifth album, Deseo (2002), was also produced by Carlos Jean; musically it was closer to electronic music than her previous works. This album was also awarded a platinum certification.

2005–2006: Contract with Warner, Pastora Soler and Sus grandes éxitos 

In 2005, she changed record company and signed to Warner Music Spain. Her first studio album with Warner, Pastora Soler, produced by Danilo Ballo and recorded in Madrid and Milan, included more mature music and themes. Its first promotional single "Sólo tú" was a dramatic ballad. The album received a gold certification for its sales. The same year her first compilation album was released, Sus grandes éxitos.

2007: Toda mi verdad 
Her seventh studio album, Toda mi verdad, was released in 2007. Recorded in Tarifa and produced by Jacobo Calderón, it consisted mostly of compositions by Antonio Martínez-Ares. For the first time a composition by Soler herself was included, the song that gives title to the album. The album peaked at number thirteen in the official Spanish album chart and received the Premio de la Música (Spanish Music Award) for Best Copla Album. The tour that followed the release of the album took her to Egypt, where she performed at the Cairo Opera House.

2009–2010: Bendita locura and 15 años 
In February 2009, her single "Bendita locura" was released, the single that gives title to the same titled studio album. The album, produced by Pablo Pinilla, consisted of thirteen new tracks, including a duet with Manuel Carrasco and compositions by David DeMaría, Martínez Ares, Esmeralda Grao, Vanesa Martín, David Santiesteban, José Abraham and Alejandro Sanz. It peaked at number eight in the official Spanish album chart.

In September 2010 she released a CD+DVD recorded live at the Teatro Lope de Vega in Seville that celebrated her 15 years of career as a recording artist, 15 años. It includes her biggest hits, as well as duets with Malú, Miguel Poveda and Manuel Carrasco. The single chosen to promote this album was an acoustic version of "La mala costumbre", a song dedicated to her father that was included in her previous work. The album peaked at number eight in the official Spanish album chart. The album was nominated for the 2011 Latin Grammy Award for Best Flamenco Album. In Spain, it won the Premio de la Música for Best Copla Album and was nominated for Best Album of the Year.

2011–2012: Una mujer como yo and Eurovision Song Contest 

Her ninth studio album was released in October 2011, Una mujer como yo, including twelve new tracks. It was produced by Pablo Pinilla. The album debuted at number No. 3 on the Spanish album chart.

On 21 December 2011 she was selected internally by RTVE to represent Spain in the Eurovision Song Contest 2012 in Baku, Azerbaijan. The song "Quédate conmigo", penned by Thomas G:son, Tony Sánchez-Ohlsson and Erik Bernholm, was chosen as her entry in a special live show on 3 March. On 26 May 2012 she finished 10th in the Eurovision final with 97 points. Commercially, "Quédate conmigo" ranked at number 35 on the year-end Spanish singles chart.

2013: El Número Uno and Conóceme 
In 2013, Soler was hired as a judge for the second season of Spanish talent show El Número Uno along with David Bustamante, Mónica Naranjo and Pitingo. The show aired on Antena 3 from 31 May to 5 July 2013.

On 10 September 2013 Soler released her tenth studio album, Conóceme, produced by Tony Sánchez-Ohlsson. The album was preceded by its first single, "Te despertaré", which was released on 22 July 2013 and debuted at number 17 on the Spanish Singles Chart. The album debuted at number 2 on the Spanish Album Chart.

2014–2016: 20 and career hiatus, La Voz Kids 
On 1 December 2014, Soler announced that she would stop her career for a while citing stage fright problems. On 8 March 2014, Soler had fainted on stage in a concert in Seville, and she had postponed or cancelled a number of events afterwards. The announcement came after she abruptly left the stage during a concert in Málaga on 30 November 2014.

The career hiatus announcement coincided in time with the release of a compilation album to celebrate her 20 years of career as a recording artist, titled 20, on 9 December 2014.

In October 2015, Soler made an appearance as a guest mentor on the second season of Spanish series La Voz Kids (The Voice Kids).

2017–2018: La calma and national tour 
On 1 February 2017, Soler announced through her social media that she had ended her break from music career and that she would start recording a new studio album, produced by Pablo Cebrián. She also announced a national tour of concerts through Spain for 2017 with stops in Madrid's Teatro Real, Barcelona's Liceu, Seville's Auditorio Rocío Jurado, and Valencia's Palau de les Arts, among others. On 14 July 2017, "La tormenta", the first single of her upcoming album, was released. Her eleventh studio album, titled La calma, was released on 15 September 2017. It debuted at number 1 on the Spanish Album Chart, her first number one with Warner ever.

2019–present: Sentir, La Voz Senior and Mask Singer
On 18 October 2019, Soler released her twelfth studio album, titled Sentir and produced by Pablo Cebrián. It was preceded by the promotional single "Aunque me cueste la vida". In December 2019, Soler was featured in the holiday television special Quédate conmigo on La 1 on occasion of her twenty-fifth anniversary as a recording artist.

In 2020, Soler became a coach on the second season of Spanish series La Voz Senior (The Voice Senior). Also in 2020, Soler participated in the Antena 3 series Mask Singer: Adivina quién canta (part of the Masked Singer franchise) as Pavo Real (Peacock).

Family life 
Soler married choreographer Francis Viñolo on 17 October 2009. Together they have two daughters, Estrella (born 15 September 2015) and Vega (born 28 January 2020).

Discography

Studio albums

Live albums

Compilations

EPs

Singles

References

External links

Information
Information

1978 births
Living people
People from Coria del Río
Singers from Andalusia
Spanish Roman Catholics
Flamenco singers
Eurovision Song Contest entrants of 2012
Eurovision Song Contest entrants for Spain
21st-century Spanish singers
21st-century Spanish women singers